The twenty-four kohanic gifts are a description in the Gemara tradition of offerings given to the Jewish priests. The adjective "kohanic" means "of a kohen", relating to a Jewish priest.

The Kohanim were compensated for their service in the Temple in Jerusalem – and to the nation – through twenty-four "priestly gifts."  The majority of these gifts were food items. Of these twenty-four gifts, ten gifts were given to the priests in the Temple, four were to be consumed by the priests in Jerusalem, and ten were to be given to the priests outside the land of Israel. 

The gifts are not given today, because there is no Holy Temple in Jerusalem. For example, most practicing Jews today do not give first-born of their animals to modern Kohanim. Other practices may be followed, such as selling the mother animal to a non-Jew before it gives birth to the firstborn, and then buying back both the mother and the firstborn.

Gifts
According to the Tosefta, ten 'gifts' which were to be given to the Kohanim within the Temple area were portions of:
1. an animal brought as a sin offering
2. guilt offering
3. sacrifices of the communal peace offering
4. a bird brought in as a sin offering
5. the suspensive guilt offering
6. the olive oil offering of a metzora
7. the two loaves of bread brought on Shavuot (first fruits)
8. the showbread
9. the left-over portion of the meal offering
10. the left-over portion of grain from the offering of the first sheaf, the omer offering

Four further gifts to be given (or to be consumed) within the confines of the walls of Jerusalem were:
11. firstborn of any domestic kosher animal
12. first fruits
13. the inner organs of certain offerings, that which is removed from the Nazirite offering
14. the skins of certain offerings

Ten gifts which might be given (or consumed) outside of Jerusalem were:
15. heave offering of a portion of the harvest
16. heave offering of the tithe - a tithe of the Levite's tithe
17. Challah - Dough offering
18. the first shearing of the sheep
19. foreleg, cheeks and maw of all non-sanctified, ritually slaughtered domestic animals
20. money given in exchange for redemption of a first-born son (Hebrew: pidyon haben פדיון הבן; redemption of the son) - in rabbinical practice five silver shekels for the redemption of a firstborn Israelite son
21. money (or a sheep or goat) redeemed in place of a firstborn donkey
22. things declared herem, the hromim property or possession dedicated to the Temple without specifying to which use it is to be given
23. inherited fields that were dedicated to the Temple and not reclaimed in the Jubilee year
24. that recovered which was stolen from a resident alien who has died, leaving no heirs

Females, who did not serve in the Tabernacle or the Temple, were permitted to consume and/or benefit from some of the twenty-four priestly gifts. But if a Kohen's daughter married a man from outside the Kohanic line, she was no longer permitted to benefit from the priestly gifts. Conversely, the daughter of a non-priest who married a priest took on the same rights as an unmarried daughter of a priest.

See also
Presumption of priestly descent

References

External links
 The Cohen-Levi Family Heritage
 Modern application of redeeming the firstborn donkey

Oral Torah
Priesthood (Judaism)
Giving
Jewish agrarian laws